Swaminarayan Akshardham in Robbinsville, New Jersey, is a Hindu mandir (temple) complex. The BAPS Shri Swaminarayan Mandir, one component of the campus, was inaugurated and opened to the public on August 10, 2014 as the world’s largest Hindu temple outside India. The Mandir is geographically situated at the heart of the U.S. Northeast megalopolis and with relative proximity to Newark International Airport, which handles nonstop flights to India. 

Portions of the complex still under construction include the Akshardham Mahamandir and a visitor's center, which will include an exhibition on Hindu faith and culture.

BAPS Shri Swaminarayan Mandir  
The BAPS Shri Swaminarayan Mandir in Robbinsville in Central New Jersey is a Hindu place of worship built by the BAPS Swaminarayan Sanstha and consecrated by Pramukh Swami Maharaj. The BAPS Swaminarayan Sanstha, led by Mahant Swami Maharaj, is a denomination of the Swaminarayan branch of Hinduism. The mandir is built of hand-carved Italian Carrara marble, Indian pink stone and limestone. The mandir was constructed according to guidelines outlined in ancient Vedas, or Hindu scriptures. The mandir is open daily to visitors and for worship. In addition to the mandir, the complex includes a congregation hall.

Mandir and daily rituals 
The mandir is a shikarbaddha mandir, built according to principles laid out in the Shilpa Shastras, Hindu texts prescribing standards of sacred architecture. Within the mandir, murtis, the sacred images of the deities, have been consecrated. The central shrine holds the murtis of Swaminarayan and Gunatitanand Swami, together worshipped as Akshar-Purushottam Maharaj. Similarly, different shrines hold other murtis, including Radha and Krishna; Shiva and Parvati; Sita and Ram; Hanuman; Ganapati; and the lineage of BAPS gurus who are Swaminarayan's spiritual successors.

According to Hindu beliefs, once the divine has been invoked in a murti, it becomes an embodiment of the Divine. Accordingly, Swaminarayan swamis, or monks, offer devotional worship to the deities throughout the day. Before dawn, they awaken the deities by singing prabhatiya (morning hymns). The deities are then bathed and offered food and garments depending on the time of the day and season. Food that has been offered to the deities is considered sanctified and distributed to the devotees as prasadam. Aarti, a ritual where devotees sing the glory of God while a lighted wick is circulated before the murtis, is performed five times a day and named mangala aarti, shanagar aarti, rajabhoga aarti, sandhya aarti and shayana aarti, respectively. Finally, swamis adorn the murtis with night garments and ask the deities to retire for the night.

Construction 
The BAPS Shri Swaminarayan Mandir in Robbinsville, New Jersey was first proposed and envisioned by Pramukh Swami Maharaj in 1997 as a part of Swaminarayan Akshardham in North America. The mandir's construction commenced in 2010. The mandir was built in the Nagaradi style using 68,000 cubic feet of Italian Carrara marble. The marble obtained from quarries in Europe was shipped to Rajasthan, India where hundreds of artisans carved the stones. After the finished pieces of stone were assembled in workshops, engineers sequentially numbered the pieces and shipped them to Robbinsville. Upon their arrival, the pieces were organized using the numbering system to facilitate the mandir's construction.

A decorative mandap, or enclosure, was built around the mandir to shield it from harsh weather and facilitate its year-round use. The structure is 87 feet wide, 133 feet long, and 42 feet high. The entrance to the mandap, called the Mayur Dwar, contains carvings depicting peacocks, elephants, and celebrated Hindu devotees of past eras.

The mandir was constructed primarily through the efforts of artisans and volunteers who provided an estimated 4.7 million human hours. Volunteers engaged in various tasks during the construction process, including design and engineering, carving coordination & stone shipping, site preparation, lighting and electrical wiring, polishing, cleaning the assembled marble, tent-building, meal preparation, and offering medical services.

Opening 
The mandir was officially opened to the public on August 10, 2014, after the murtis were consecrated in the presence of Pramukh Swami Maharaj and senior swamis of BAPS. A number of dignitaries were present during the opening ceremony, including New Jersey Senator Cory Booker, Maryland Rep. Steny Hoyer, Pennsylvania Rep. Mike Fitzpatrick, New Jersey Rep. Frank Pallone, New Jersey Attorney General John Jay Hoffman, and Indian Consul General Dnyaneshwar Mulay. The opening was part of a three-day celebration and featured a grand yagna in which participants prayed for world peace and a women's cultural program focused on interfaith harmony. Over 20,000 visitors participated in the various events. An expansive Shayona Cafe opened in June 2022, serving gourmet South Indian and North Indian cuisine.

Akshardham Mahamandir

Construction 

The installation ceremony of the first marble pillar of the Akshardham Mahamandir took place on September 4, 2017. The celebration was marked with tours of the complex and cultural programs culminating with the Vedic ceremony in the presence of Mahant Swami Maharaj.

Controversy 

On May 11, 2021, six workers involved in the construction filed suit in federal court alleging the temple administrators violated labor laws. In relation to this, the Federal Bureau of Investigation, Department of Labor, and Department of Homeland Security visited the site on "court-authorized law enforcement activity." The lawsuit alleges wage theft, forced labor, and human trafficking, and may be the largest forced-labor lawsuit brought in the U.S. since 1995. The suit alleges that over 200 Indian men, most of them members of the Dalit caste, were brought to the U.S. to do dangerous manual labor for 13 hours per day, for compensation of only $450 per month, $400 of which was paid to their accounts in India. It further alleges that their passports were taken and that they were confined to the compound under constant surveillance. Spokespersons for BAPS said that the allegations would be shown to be without merit.

Charitable initiatives 
Since 2012, BAPS Charities has hosted charitable events at the Robbinsville mandir, such as health fairs and seminars led by volunteer medical professionals. Donations collected from annual walk-a-thons have supported humanitarian causes, like planting 300,000 trees to support the Nature Conservancy's initiative to plant 1 billion trees by 2025.

During the COVID-19 global pandemic, BAPS Charities has provided relief and assistance worldwide. On March 29, 2020, all six BAPS shikharbaddha mandirs in North America broadcast a special mahapuja performed by the swamis to pray on behalf of all those affected by the COVID-19 pandemic. Over 12,000 families in North America participated.    

Within one month of the onset of the COVID-19 pandemic, 5,500 N95 facemasks were donated to Robert Wood Johnson University Hospital in Hamilton and New Brunswick, Capital Health Hospitals, Penn Medicine at Princeton Medical Center and Robbinsville Township and other medical organizations throughout New Jersey. Over 4,000 hot meals were served to first responders in New York and New Jersey, including Robbinsville Township Police Department and Fire Department and Saint Francis Medical Center. BAPS Charities delivered care packages to seniors in New Jersey. A food drive was also organized to collect non-perishable food items for the Robbinsville Township Food Pantry and NJ Rise.  

On April 30, 2021, BAPS Charities hosted a vaccination drive in conjunction with Robert Wood Johnson University Hospital at the mandir. US Surgeon General Vivek Murthy praised BAPS Charities for hosting vaccination clinics at mandirs which increased accessibility for the elderly.

Gallery

See also

 Swaminarayan Akshardham (Delhi)
 Swaminarayan Akshardham (Gandhinagar)
 Indians in the New York City metropolitan region
Oak Tree Road

References

External links 
 BAPS Swaminarayan Sanstha  The organization responsible for the creation of Akshardham

Swaminarayan temples
Hindu temples in New Jersey
Religious buildings and structures completed in 2014
Religion in New Jersey
Robbinsville Township, New Jersey
2014 establishments in New Jersey
Buildings and structures in Mercer County, New Jersey
Hinduism in the United States
Indian-American culture in New Jersey
Asian-American culture in New Jersey